Murphy USA is an American corporation based in El Dorado, Arkansas operating a chain of retail gas stations that are primarily located in proximity to Walmart stores. It was founded as a spin-off of Murphy Oil in 2013. In 2018, it was ranked 279 on the Fortune 500 list of the largest United States corporations by revenue. In 2021, Murphy USA had dropped to 322 on the Fortune 500 list. 

In the first quarter of 2016, Murphy USA announced a change in its relationship with Walmart, as they began opening their own in-house gas stations and convenience stores. It plans to increase its locations independently of Walmart sites. In 2016, Murphy USA announced that Core-Mark would be the sole distributor for their chain. It said, "...this partnership will allow Murphy to offer a larger selection of popular convenience store products."

On December 14, 2020, Murphy USA announced that it has reached an agreement to purchase QuickChek convenience stores, based in Whitehouse Station, New Jersey, for $645 million.

Locations 
Murphy USA opened its first stores exclusively adjacent to Walmart properties. As of December 15th, 2020, Murphy USA operates 1,500 retail fueling stations in 26 US states and over 1,100 sites are located near Walmart stores. Murphy USA also has 240 Murphy Express branded stores, which are located independently. Murphy Express sites are typically large-format facilities (1,200-3,400+ square feet) that offer a larger array of products and more fueling lanes than the original format.

References 

Retail companies established in 2013
Economy of the Midwestern United States
Economy of the Southeastern United States
Gas stations in the United States
Convenience stores of the United States
El Dorado, Arkansas
Automotive fuel retailers
Companies based in Arkansas
Companies listed on the New York Stock Exchange
Corporate spin-offs